John Griggs Thompson (born October 13, 1932) is an American mathematician at the University of Florida noted for his work in the field of finite groups. He was awarded the Fields Medal in 1970, the Wolf Prize in 1992, and the Abel Prize in 2008.

Biography
Thompson received his Bachelor of Arts from Yale University in 1955 and his doctorate from the University of Chicago in 1959 under the supervision of Saunders Mac Lane. After spending some time on the mathematics faculty at the University of Chicago, he moved in 1970 to receive the Rouse Ball Professorship in Mathematics at the University of Cambridge and later moved to the Mathematics Department of the University of Florida as a Graduate Research Professor.  He is currently a professor emeritus of pure mathematics at the University of Cambridge, and a professor of mathematics at the University of Florida.  He received the Abel Prize in 2008 together with Jacques Tits.

Academic career
Thompson's doctoral thesis introduced new techniques and included the solution of a problem in finite group theory which had stood for around sixty years: the nilpotency of Frobenius kernels. At the time, this achievement was noted in The New York Times.

Thompson became a figure in the progress toward the classification of finite simple groups.  In 1963, he and Walter Feit proved that all nonabelian finite simple groups are of even order (the Odd Order Paper, filling a whole issue of the Pacific Journal of Mathematics). This work was recognised by the award of the 1965 Cole Prize in Algebra of the American Mathematical Society. His N-group papers classified all finite simple groups for which the normalizer of every non-identity solvable subgroup is solvable. This included, as a by-product, the classification of all minimal finite simple groups (simple groups for which every proper subgroup is solvable). This work had some influence on later developments in the classification of finite simple groups, and was quoted in the citation by Richard Brauer for the award of Thompson's Fields Medal in 1970 (Proceedings of the International Congress of Mathematicians, Nice, France, 1970).

The Thompson group Th is one of the 26 sporadic finite simple groups. Thompson also made major contributions to the inverse Galois problem. He found a criterion for a finite group to be a Galois group, that in particular implies that the monster simple group is a Galois group.

Awards
In 1971, Thompson was elected to the United States National Academy of Sciences.   In 1982, he was awarded the Senior Berwick Prize of the London Mathematical Society, and, in 1988, he received the honorary degree of Doctor of Science from the University of Oxford. Thompson was awarded the United States National Medal of Science in 2000. He is a Fellow of the Royal Society and a recipient of its Sylvester Medal in 1985. He is a member of the Norwegian Academy of Science and Letters.

See also

Feit–Thompson theorem
McKay–Thompson series
Quadratic pair
Thompson factorization
Thompson order formula
Thompson subgroup
Thompson transitivity theorem
Thompson uniqueness theorem

References

External links
 
 
 List of mathematical articles by John G. Thompson
 Biography from the Abel Prize center 

1932 births
Members of the United States National Academy of Sciences
Living people
People from Ottawa, Kansas
Institute for Advanced Study visiting scholars
Yale University alumni
University of Chicago alumni
Harvard University faculty
University of Chicago faculty
Rouse Ball Professors of Mathematics (Cambridge)
University of Florida faculty
20th-century American mathematicians
Fellows of Churchill College, Cambridge
Fellows of the Royal Society
Fields Medalists
Abel Prize laureates
Group theorists
National Medal of Science laureates
Wolf Prize in Mathematics laureates
Members of the Norwegian Academy of Science and Letters
Mathematicians from Kansas